Ihaab Boussefi (born 23 June 1985) is a Libyan footballer. He currently plays for Nasr in the Libyan Premier League. He has been capped several times at full international level for Libya, and scored both goals as Libya beat Senegal at the 2012 Africa Cup of Nations.

References

Libyan footballers
1985 births
Living people
Association football forwards
Libya international footballers
Al-Nasr SC (Benghazi) players
Al-Ittihad Club (Tripoli) players
People from Tripoli, Libya
2012 Africa Cup of Nations players
Libyan Premier League players